Ministry of Agriculture and Irrigation (Arabic: وزارة الزراعة والري  ) is a cabinet ministry of Yemen.

List of ministers 
 Salem Abdullah Issa Al-Soqotri (17 December 2020 – present)
 Othman Mujali (2018–2020)
 Farid Ahmed Mujaour (2014)

See also 
 Politics of Yemen

References 

Government ministries of Yemen